Caesar Benzio (died 1595) was a Roman Catholic prelate who served as Bishop of Asti (1594–1595).

Biography
On 24 October 1594, Caesar Benzio was appointed during the papacy of Pope Clement VIII as Bishop of Asti.
He served as Bishop of Asti until his death on 18 December 1595.

References

External links and additional sources
 (for Chronology of Bishops) 
 (for Chronology of Bishops) 

16th-century Italian Roman Catholic bishops
Bishops appointed by Pope Clement VIII
1595 deaths